Perets is a  surname, a spelling variant of Peretz. Notable people with the surname include:

Amir Perets, Israeli-born American mixed martial artist, entrepreneur
Sergey Perets, Russian police officer
Yaniv Perets,  Canadian college ice hockey goaltender

See also

Perez